Ernst Klauser (born 22 December 1934) is a Swiss former footballer who played in the 1950s. He played as a striker.

Klauser joined FC Basel's first team for their 1953–54 season under player-coach René Bader. Klauser played his domestic league debut for the club in the away game on 29 November 1953 as Basel played a 2–2 draw with Servette.

Klauser stayed with Basel for two seasons and then he moved on to Servette for one season before he returned to his club of origin. He scored his first goal for his club on 16 March 1958 in the home game at the Landhof against Grasshopper Club. It was the last goal of the game but it did not save Basel from a 1–3 defeat.

Between the years 1953 to 1955 and again from 1956 to 1958 Klauser played a total of 28 games for Basel scoring a total of three goals. 13 of these games were in the Nationalliga A and 15 were friendly games. He scored one goal in the domestic league, the other two were scored during the test games.

Following his time with Basel Klauser moved on to play for the regional team FC Black Stars Basel.

References

Sources
 Rotblau: Jahrbuch Saison 2017/2018. Publisher: FC Basel Marketing AG. 
 Die ersten 125 Jahre. Publisher: Josef Zindel im Friedrich Reinhardt Verlag, Basel. 
 Verein "Basler Fussballarchiv" Homepage

FC Basel players
Servette FC players
FC Black Stars Basel players
Swiss men's footballers
Association football forwards
1934 births
Living people
Footballers from Basel